Cyclogramma is a genus of ferns in the family Thelypteridaceae, subfamily Thelypteridoideae, in the Pteridophyte Phylogeny Group classification of 2016 (PPG I). Other sources sink Cyclogramma into a very broadly defined genus Thelypteris.

Species
, the Checklist of Ferns and Lycophytes of the World accepted the following species:
Cyclogramma auriculata (J.Sm.) Ching
Cyclogramma chunii (Ching) Tagawa
Cyclogramma costularisora Ching ex K.H.Shing
Cyclogramma flexilis (Christ) Tagawa
Cyclogramma leveillei (Christ) Ching
Cyclogramma maguanensis Ching ex K.H.Shing
Cyclogramma neoauriculata (Ching) Tagawa
Cyclogramma omeiensis (Baker) Tagawa
Cyclogramma squamaestipes (C.B.Clarke) Tagawa

References

Thelypteridaceae
Fern genera